The 2003 Miami RedHawks football team represented Miami University in the 2003 NCAA Division I-A football season.  They competed in the East Division of the Mid-American Conference (MAC) . The team was coached by Terry Hoeppner and played their homes game in Yager Stadium. The Redhawks finished the season with a record of 13–1 (8–0 MAC). They won the MAC for the first time since 1986 and was invited to the GMAC Bowl, where they beat Louisville 49–28.

Schedule

After the season

Comments
Two Miami players were drafted into the National Football League: quarterback Ben Roethlisberger, left as a junior without a degree with a year of college eligibility remaining and was selected by the Pittsburgh Steelers in the first round, #11 overall, and guard Jacob Bell, taken by the Tennessee Titans in the fifth round, #138 overall. Roethlisberger's #11 selection was the highest ever draft pick for a player from Miami.

Awards
The Columbus Dispatch named Hoeppner "Ohio College Coach of the Year." The 2003 team as a whole earned the American Football Coaches Association's "Academic Achievement Honor" for achieving a graduation rate over 70%.

References

Miami
Miami RedHawks football seasons
Mid-American Conference football champion seasons
LendingTree Bowl champion seasons
Miami RedHawks football